.ge is the country code top-level domain (ccTLD) for Georgia. .ge top-level domain names are available for direct registration for individuals and companies worldwide, without any restriction on citizenship or residence. Second-level domain names are also available for registration for several specific types of registrants:

  – only for commercial organizations
  – only for educational institutions
  – only for schools
  – only for governmental organizations
  – only for non-governmental organizations
  – only for state military organizations (discontinued domain zone, mil.ge domain registered to Ministry)
  – only for network provider or network project organizations
  – only for private persons

History
.ge was delegated to Georgian ISP SaNet in 1992. Registration service was initially provided by non-profit organization Internet Development Group - Georgia, but after introduction of Caucasus Online it exclusively consolidated both administrative and registrar roles. .gov.ge was delegated to LEPL Smart Logic in 2014.

Registrar Companies 
Since April 16, 2018, according to renewed regulations of Registration and administration of .GE domain, Caucasus Online administrates only the .GE country code top-level domain. The registrar's functions and duties are exercised by registrars, accredited by Caucasus Online, who will register and manage .GE domain names; The .GE country code top level domain is registered by accredited companies.

.გე
In 2011, a new top-level domain name was registered for Georgia, intended for domain names in the local language. The top-level domain is .გე (.xn--node), which are the Georgian letters gani and eni, representing G and E rather than an abbreviation of a native word. It became active with active web sites in 2016.

Starting January 20, 2016, Georgia registered .გე top-level domains using Georgian Mkhedruli script. At first, the process started for reservation of governmental and commercial TLDs but after 6 months from start date, registration of IDN ccTLDs became available to the general public.

References

External links
IANA .ge whois information
.GE Domain Registrar Companies

Internet in Georgia (country)
Country code top-level domains
Computer-related introductions in 1992
1992 establishments in Georgia (country)
Council of European National Top Level Domain Registries members